Kolbeinsvik is a village in Austevoll municipality in Vestland county, Norway. The small islands of Drøna and Rostøy lie just to the north, off the coast of Huftarøy. It had a population of 481 in 2001.

References

Villages in Vestland
Austevoll